Adam Clendening (born October 26, 1992) is an American professional ice hockey defenseman who currently plays for the Hartford Wolf Pack of the American Hockey League (AHL). Clendening was raised in Wheatfield, New York.  He was selected 36th overall by the Chicago Blackhawks in the 2011 NHL Entry Draft.

Early life 
Clendening was born on October 26, 1992, in Niagara Falls, New York. He grew up in Wheatfield, New York, but his father Frank was a lifelong fan of the Boston Bruins of the National Hockey League (NHL), and Clendening grew up supporting the Bruins rather than the nearby Buffalo Sabres. His parents were also friends with the parents of future NHL star Patrick Kane, and the two would practice playing ice hockey together. In 2004, Clendening participated in the Quebec International Pee-Wee Hockey Tournament with a team from Rochester, New York. When he enrolled at Niagara-Wheatfield High School, Clendening originally wanted to pursue golf, playing on the varsity team as a freshman. The following year, however, he moved to Toronto to pursue hockey.

Playing career

Junior
After securing the permission of his mother Ann, Clendening moved to Canada at the age of 14 to play for the Toronto Marlboros AAA junior ice hockey team of the Greater Toronto Hockey League, where he was coached by NHL alum Steve Thomas. After he put up 45 points in 38 games with Toronto, the USA Hockey National Team Development Program selected Clendening for their under-17 team based in Ann Arbor, Michigan. With the development program, Clendening not only competed in the North American Hockey League (NAHL), but would play against NCAA Division I and Division III college ice hockey teams, as well as international squads. He had a breakout sophomore season with USA Hockey, leading all junior defensemen with 49 points (including 14 goals in 65 North American games, while also leading his team with 120 penalty minutes. His 20 points in 18 international games also led the development team.

NCAA
His performance with the USA development team made Clendening a valuable recruit, who was sought after both by junior teams and by college programs. He originally made a verbal commitment to play for Boston College, but that arrangement fell through when Clendening continued to pursue his options in the Ontario Hockey League (OHL). The London Knights selected Clendening in the 2008 OHL Draft, but Clendening chose to attend Boston University and play for the Terriers after assessing that scouts were looking more intently at college players than junior hockey skaters.

After two seasons with the Terriers, posting nine goals and 59 points for a combined +19 in 77 games, Clendening chose to leave the program in favor of pursuing an NHL career.

Professional

Chicago Blackhawks
Clendening made his NHL debut on November 20, 2014 and scored his first NHL goal on his first shot against Jonas Hiller of the Calgary Flames. Clendening spent the majority of his time with the club with their American Hockey League (AHL) affiliate, the Rockford Icehogs.

Vancouver Canucks

On January 29, 2015, the Blackhawks traded Clendening to the Vancouver Canucks in exchange for Gustav Forsling. Clendening finished out the season appearing in 17 games for the Canucks, as well as 11 games for the Utica Comets.

Pittsburgh Penguins
On July 28, 2015, Clendening, along with Nick Bonino and a 2nd-round pick in the 2016 NHL Entry Draft were traded from the Canucks to the Pittsburgh Penguins in exchange for Brandon Sutter and a 3rd-round pick in the 2016 NHL Entry Draft. Clendening made the Penguins roster to open the 2015–16 season, and would appear in 9 games for the club, as well as 6 for the Wilkes-Barre/Scranton Penguins.

Anaheim Ducks and Edmonton Oilers
On January 16, 2016, Clendening was included in yet another trade, being sent to the Anaheim Ducks alongside David Perron in exchange for Carl Hagelin. However, Clendening's time with the Ducks was short-lived, as he was claimed off waivers by the Edmonton Oilers two weeks later on January 27. This marked the fifth organization Clendening would join within the year, though he never actually played a game whilst with the Ducks. Clendening skated in 20 games for the Oilers, recording 1 goal and 6 points.

New York Rangers
On July 1, 2016, Clendening signed as a free agent to a one-year, two-way contract with the New York Rangers. Clendening appeared in 31 games for the Rangers, scoring 11 points.

Arizona Coyotes and return to Chicago
On July 1, 2017, Clendening signed a one-year, one-way contract as a free agent with the Arizona Coyotes. Having made the Coyotes opening night roster for the 2017–18 season, Clendening only appeared in 5 games for the team before he was placed on waivers and reassigned to play 21 games for the Tucson Roadrunners of the AHL.

On January 10, 2018, Clendening, alongside Anthony Duclair was traded to the Blackhawks in exchange for Richard Pánik and Laurent Dauphin, returning to Chicago for a second stint. He was immediately assigned to play out the remainder of the season with the Rockford IceHogs of the AHL.

Columbus Blue Jackets
As a free agent from the Blackhawks, Clendening left to sign a one-year, two-way contract with the Columbus Blue Jackets on July 1, 2018. He began the 2018–19 season on the Blue Jackets opening night roster, featuring in 4 games before he was placed on waivers and reassigned to AHL affiliate, the Cleveland Monsters. Leading the Monsters blueline in scoring, Clendening posted 4 goals and 37 points in 45 games, before he was recalled by Columbus to add depth for the playoffs. He made his NHL playoff debut with the Blue Jackets, appearing in game 3 of the Eastern Conference Quarterfinals against the Tampa Bay Lightning. He went on to collect an assist in 7 games before ending his season in the Conference Semifinals to the Boston Bruins.

On June 25, 2019, Clendening was re-signed to a two-year $1.4 million contract extension with the Columbus Blue Jackets.

Philadelphia Flyers
Following his third season within the Blue Jackets organization, Clendening left as a free agent and secured a one-year, two-way contract with the Philadelphia Flyers for the  season on July 28, 2021.

Return to Rockford and trade to Hartford
On July 18, 2022, Clendening signed a one-year AHL contract to return to the IceHogs for the 2022–23 season, his third stint with the club. Clendening posted 3 goals and 24 points through 48 games to co-lead in scoring from the blueline for the IceHogs. In the aftermath of the Patrick Kane trade between the Blackhawks and Rangers, Clendening was traded at the AHL level to the Rangers AHL affiliate, the Hartford Wolf Pack, in exchange for Zach Jordan on February 28, 2023.

International play 
After a number of injuries hamstrung Team USA's under-18 roster, Clendening was called up from the under-17 team for the 2009 IIHF World U18 Championships in Minnesota. He appeared in seven championship games, putting up two assists as Team USA defeated Russia 5–0 to win a dark horse gold medal.

Career statistics

Regular season and playoffs

International

Awards and honors

References

External links
 

1992 births
Living people
American men's ice hockey defensemen
Arizona Coyotes players
Boston University Terriers men's ice hockey players
Chicago Blackhawks draft picks
Chicago Blackhawks players
Cleveland Monsters players
Columbus Blue Jackets players
Edmonton Oilers players
Hartford Wolf Pack players
Ice hockey players from New York (state)
Lehigh Valley Phantoms players
New York Rangers players
People from Niagara County, New York
Pittsburgh Penguins players
Rockford IceHogs (AHL) players
Tucson Roadrunners players
USA Hockey National Team Development Program players
Utica Comets players
Vancouver Canucks players
Wilkes-Barre/Scranton Penguins players